Francesc Ribalta  (2 June 1565 – 12 January 1628), also known as Francisco Ribaltá or de Ribalta,  was a Spanish painter of the Baroque period, mostly of religious subjects.

Biography
He was born in Solsona, Lleida. Although his first apprenticeship was  apparently  with Navarrete, who worked for years in the Escorial, Ribalta's earliest work (a Cruxifixion of 1582) was signed in Madrid. After his years in Madrid, Ribalta was to settle as an artist in Valencia. He became among the first followers in Spain of the austere tenebrist style of Caravaggio. It is unclear if he directly visited either Rome or Naples, where Caravaggio's style had many adherents. 

Alternatively, it is likely that tenebrist paintings were available in Spain by the early 17th century through the Spanish rule of the Neapolitan kingdom.  Jusepe de Ribera is said to have been one of his pupils, although it is entirely possible that Ribera acquired his tenebrism when he moved to Italy.

Style
The tenebrist style gathered a number of adherents in Spain, and was to influence the pre-eminent Baroque or Golden Age Spanish painters, especially Zurbarán, but also Velázquez and Murillo. Even the art of still life in Spain, the bodegón, was often painted in a similar stark and austere style. Among the direct disciples of Francisco were his son, Juan Ribalta, Antonio Bisquert, and his son-in-law, Vicente Castelló. Ribalta died in Valencia on 12 January 1628.

Honours
A park and a monument bears his name along with his son in Castelló. Also the oldest high school of that city and its province.

Works
 Crucifixion, his first work.
 Some works in El Escorial.
 Martyrdom of St. Peter 
 Martyr of St. Catherine (around 1605), oil on panel 123x108 cm, The Hermitage, Saint Petersburg
 Portrait of Margarita Agulló (around 1605)
 The Vision of Father Francisco Jerónimo Simon, also known as the Venerable Simon (1612–19), oil on panel, 211x111 cm, National Gallery, London
 St. Francis Comforted by the Angel (San Francisco confortado por un ángel músico) (around 1620), oil on panel, 204x158 cm, Musel del Prado, Madrid
 Ramon Llull (around 1620)
 Saint Roch (around 1625), oil on panel 124x60 cm, Museo de Bellas Artes, Valencia
 Saint Sebastian (around 1625), oil on panel, 124x60 cm, Museo des Bellas Artes, Valencia
 The Gospel of Saint Luke (1625–27), oil on canvas 83x36 cm, Museo de Portacoeli, Valencia

Bibliography
Benito Domenech, Fernando (1987). Los Ribalta y la pintura valenciana de su tiempo,  Valencia-Madrid. .
Benito Domenech, Fernando y Vallés Borrás, Vicent Joan (1989). "Un proceso a Francisco Ribalta en 1618". Boletín de la Academia de Bellas Artes de San Fernando (69):  p. 143-168. 
Falomir Faus, Miguel (1998-1999). "Imágenes de una santidad frustrada: el culto a Francisco Jerónimo Simón, 1612-1619". Locvs Amoenvs (4):  p. 171-183.

Kowal, David M. (1985). Ribalta y los ribaltescos: La evolución del estilo barroco en Valencia. Valencia, Diputación Provincial. .
Palomino, Antonio, An account of the lives and works of the most eminent Spanish painters, sculptors and architects, 1724, first English translation, 1739, p. 28
Palomino, Antonio (1988). El museo pictórico y escala óptica III. El parnaso español pintoresco laureado. Madrid, Aguilar S.A. de Ediciones. .
Pérez Sánchez, Alfonso E. (1992). Baroque Paintings in Spain (1600-1750). Cátedra, Madrid. .
Piombo (1995). Sebastiano del Piombo in Spain. Madrid, Museo del Prado, .

References

External links

Jusepe de Ribera, 1591-1652, a full text exhibition catalog from The Metropolitan Museum of Art, which includes material on Francisco Ribalta (see index)
 Biography at the Museo del Prado Online Encyclopedia which includes the full exhibition catalog 
 Digital works of Francisco Ribalta at the Hispánica Digital Library at the Spanish National Library 

1565 births
1628 deaths
People from Solsonès
Painters from the Valencian Community
Catholic painters
16th-century Spanish painters
Spanish male painters
17th-century Spanish painters
Caravaggisti